Johann Markgraf von Pallavicini (18 March 1848 – 4 May 1941), was an Austro-Hungarian diplomat, notably serving as ambassador at the Sublime Porte during World War I.

Life 
He was born in Padua on 18 March 1848 into the ancient noble Pallavicini family. He entered the Austro-Hungarian foreign service after studies in Ödenburg (now Sopron) and Vienna. In 1871, he was dispatched as attaché to Berlin, in 1878 to Paris and in 1880 to London. In 1887, he was an embassy secretary in Belgrade and in 1894 a counselor in Munich before being sent to St. Petersburg the same year. He was appointed minister at Bucharest in January 1899.

On 5 October 1906, Marquis von Pallavicini was appointed ambassador at Constantinople (now Istanbul) by Emperor Franz Joseph I. In 1911, he temporarily acted as Foreign Minister during the illness of Count Lexa von Aehrenthal. Marquis von Pallavicini was widely regarded as one of the most respected diplomats of the Dual Monarchy and was in difference to Count Lexa von Aehrenthal and many of the younger diplomats in Ballhausplatz against the annexation of Bosnia in 1908.

During World War I, he successfully worked for bringing the Ottoman Empire into the war on the  side of the Central Powers. Due to his long tenure and being the dean of the diplomatic corps in Constantinople, he was considered to wield a large influence over events in the Ottoman Empire. However, his role with regard to the Armenian Question has been debated by historians over the years and criticism has been raised that he did not protest loudly enough. The reports that he sent to Vienna clearly show that he was aware of the nature of the Ottoman initiative and that it involved a "centrally planned and organised extermination". Already in June 1915, he wrote to Vienna that "the Armenian population ... is not only being subjected to the greatest misery but also to a total extermination (einer gänzlichen Ausrottung)". To his defence, however, records also show that he did protest but to no avail.

In April 1917, Markgraf von Pallavicini politely declined Emperor Karl I's offer of becoming Foreign Minister. 

He was bestowed with the Grand Cross of the Order of Saint Stephen in 1917 and appointed a member of the Upper House in 1927.

Marquis von Pallavicini died in Pusztaradvány on 4 May 1941.

Notes 
Regarding personal names: Markgraf is a title, translated as Marquis, not a first or middle name. The female form is Markgräfin.

See also 
 Witnesses and testimonies of the Armenian genocide

References

External links 
 'Pallavicini János Markgraf von', Österreichisches Biographisches Lexikon 1815-1950
 'Markgraf Janós von Pallavicini', Solving Problems Through Force
 'Pallavicini János, őrgróf', Magyar Életrajzi Lexikon

1848 births
1941 deaths
Austro-Hungarian diplomats of World War I
Austro-Hungarian diplomats
Austrian diplomats
Hungarian diplomats
Hungarian nobility
Johann
Hungarian people of Italian descent
Witnesses of the Armenian genocide